Kepler-4 is a sunlike star located about 1610 light-years away in the constellation Draco. It is in the field of view of the Kepler Mission, a NASA operation purposed with finding Earth-like planets. Kepler-4b, a Neptune-sized planet that orbits extremely close to its star, was discovered in its orbit and  made public by the Kepler team on January 4, 2010. Kepler-4b was the first discovery by the Kepler satellite, and its confirmation helped to demonstrate the spacecraft's effectiveness.

Nomenclature and history
Kepler-4 is named for the Kepler spacecraft, a NASA telescope tasked with finding Earth-like planets that transit their stars as seen from Earth. As the previous three planets that Kepler confirmed had already been confirmed by others, Kepler-4 and its planet were the first to be discovered by the Kepler team. The star and its system were announced in Washington, D.C. at the 215th meeting of the American Astronomical Society on January 4, 2010, along with Kepler-5, Kepler-6, Kepler-7, and Kepler-8. Of the presented planets, Kepler-4b was the smallest, around the size of planet Neptune. The discovery of Kepler-4b and the other planets presented at the AAS meeting helped to confirm that the Kepler spacecraft was indeed functional.

The Harlan J. Smith Telescope at McDonald Observatory in Fort Davis, Texas was used by astronomers from the University of Texas at Austin  to follow up on Kepler's discoveries and confirm them. Telescopes in Hawaii, California, Arizona, and the Canary Islands were also used to confirm the findings.

Characteristics

Kepler-4 is a G0-type star, which is similar to the Sun, except slightly brighter. The star is 1.117 Msun and 1.555 Rsun, or 111% the mass of and 155% the radius of the Sun. With a metallicity of .09 (± 0.10)  [Fe/H], Kepler-4 is more metal-rich than the Sun, a figure that is important in that metal-rich stars tend to have orbiting planets more often than metal-poor stars. Kepler-4 is also about 6.7 billion years old. In comparison, the Sun is 4.6 billion years old. In addition, Kepler-4 has an effective temperature of 5781 (± 76) K, which is almost identical, within the errors, to that of the Sun, which is 5778 K.

As seen from Earth, Kepler-4 has an apparent magnitude of 12.7. It is, as a result, not visible with the naked eye.

Planetary system
Kepler-4b's discovery was announced on January 4, 2010. It is the size of planet Neptune, at 0.077 MJ (7% the mass of Jupiter) and 0.357 RJ (36% the radius of Jupiter). The planet orbits its star every 3.213 days at 0.045 AU from the star. This distance compares to planet Mercury, which is 0.39 AU from the Sun. Kepler-4's eccentricity was assumed to be 0, however a subsequent independent reanalysis of the discovery data found a value of 0.25 ± 0.12. Likewise, the temperature of the planet is assumed to be 1650 K, far hotter than Jupiter's, which is assumed to be 124 K (not considering its internal heat and atmosphere).

A search for transit-timing variations in all 17 quarters of Kepler data did not detect any evidence of additional planets.

See also
 List of extrasolar planets
 Kepler Mission

References

G-type main-sequence stars
Planetary systems with one confirmed planet
Draco (constellation)
7
Planetary transit variables